Oskar Ritter (30 September 1901 – 5 March 1985) was a German international footballer.

References

1901 births
1985 deaths
Association football forwards
German footballers
Germany international footballers
Holstein Kiel players